The Rankin Family is a Canadian musical family group from Mabou, Nova Scotia. Their discography comprises eight studio albums, two compilation albums, one extended play, 21 singles, 18 music videos, and one video album.

Albums

Studio albums

Compilation albums

Extended plays

Singles

Videography

Video albums

Music videos

See also
Jimmy Rankin#Discography

References

Discographies of Canadian artists
Country music discographies
Folk music discographies